Shuab ul Iman,, is a Hadith book compiled by Imam Al-Bayhaqi (384 AH – 458 AH). The author provides an exhaustive textual commentary relating to foundations of faith and its branches.

Description
It is one of the major collection of Hadiths compiled by Imam Behaqi besides his other major work in the field of Hadiths. According to Maktaba Shamila it contains almost eleven thousands (11000) Hadiths (narrations). This book describes branches of faith (Shuab ul Iman) and Imam basically has chosen the name of the book according to a Hadith of Prophet Mohammad in which he mentioned that there are more than seventy (70) branches of faith.
According to the book, Iman (faith) has three major branches as follows. 
 'Iman bil Qalb' (Testimony by Heart of all the Essentials of Iman): It refers to the states of one's ‘Qalb’ (Heart) including the ‘Niyyah’ (Intentions), ‘Aqayid’ (Doctrines), and other deeds of the heart. This entirely depends upon a person's ‘Batin’ (Hidden) states.
 'Iman bil Lisan' (Testimony by Tongue of all the essentials of Iman): It refers to the confirmation of all the essentials of Islam and adhering to them through one's ‘Lisan’ (Tongue). In other words, it is ‘Zahir’ (Apparent) in one's life, reflects the state of one's heart and generates through the tongue. 
 'Iman bil A’maal' (Testimony by Actions of all the essentials of Iman): It refers to one's ‘A’maal’ (Deeds) and is also ‘Zahir’ (Apparent), and is also a reflection of one's heart but generates from one's deeds and actions.

Publications
Several publishers have published the book in different langues (original book is in Arabic): 
  'Shuab -ul- Iman': Published: Book on Demand (1 Jan. 1901)
  'Shu‘ab al-īmān (9 v.) by Bayhaqī, Aḥmad ibn al-Ḥusayn' : Published:  Bayrūt : Dār al-Kutub al-‘Ilmīyah, 2008.
  ' al-Jami' li Shu'ab al-Iman 15 VOLUMES (الجَامِعُ لِشُعَبْ الإِيمَان) by Imam al-Bayhaqi': Published: PUBLISHED: Ministry of Religious Endowment of Qatar / Dar al-Salafiyyah | Mumbai, India (2008)
  ' Shuab -Ul- Iman -Urdu- by Imam Bayhaqi (R.A)': Published: Nobel Press

See also
 List of Sunni books
 Sunan al-Kubra
 Sunan al-Wusta

References

9th-century Arabic books
10th-century Arabic books
Sunni literature
Hadith
Hadith collections
Sunni hadith collections